Shariff Aguak, officially the Municipality of Shariff Aguak (Maguindanaoan: Kuta Shariff Aguak), is a 3rd class municipality in the province of Maguindanao del Sur, Philippines. According to the 2020 census, it has a population of 33,982 people.

It is formerly known as Maganoy.
 
Despite only being the de jure (by law) seat of Maguindanao's provincial government from 1973 to 1977, the town—being home to several previous governors—has served as the de facto (by practice) capital during the governorships of Sandiale Sambolawan (1980–1986), Andal Ampatuan, Sr. (2001–2008) and Sajid Ampatuan (2008–2009).

History
Shariff Aguak was founded as Maganoy in September 11, 1963, when President Diosdado Macapagal signed Executive Order No. 47 stipulating the creation of the municipality within the old province of Cotabato. It was created from the southern 28 barangays of Datu Piang.

The town's name was changed from Maganoy to Shariff Aguak by virtue of Muslim Mindanao Autonomy Act No. 45 in 1996.

On July 30, 2009, upon the ratification of Muslim Mindanao Autonomy Acts No. 225 (as amended by MMAA 252) and MMAA 220, the municipalities of Shariff Saydona Mustapha and Datu Hoffer Ampatuan, respectively, were created from a total of 13 barangays of the 26 Shariff Aguak, in addition to other barangays from Datu Piang, Datu Saudi-Ampatuan, Datu Unsay and Mamasapano.

Shariff Aguak (then Maganoy) was Maguindanao's provincial capital from its creation in 1973 to 1977. In 1977, President Ferdinand Marcos moved the province's seat of government to the municipality of Sultan Kudarat by virtue of Presidential Decree No. 1170. Batas Pambansa Blg. 211, enacted in 1982, aimed to formally restore the status of Maganoy as Maguindanao's seat of provincial government but the plebiscite scheduled for December 18, 1982 was never administered, thereby making the law not legally binding. However, the town has served as the de facto capital during the tenure of previous governors who hails from the town. By law (de jure), Sultan Kudarat was historically recognized as the capital of Maguindanao from 1977 until 2014 when the Sangguniang Panlalawigan of Maguindanao approved a resolution formally recognizing Buluan as the new provincial capital. In 2019 incumbent Governor Bai Mariam Mangudadatu expressed plans to move the provincial capitol back to Shariff Aguak.

Pending the completion of the new provincial capitol complex at Buluan, the executive branch of provincial government holds offices in that town's Rajah Buayan Silongan Peace Center. On the other hand, the legislative branch of provincial government, the Sangguniang Panlalawigan of Maguindanao, continues to hold sessions in the rehabilitated buildings of the old provincial capitol in Barangay Simuay Crossing in the town of Sultan Kudarat. The Ampatuan-built former provincial capitol complex in Shariff Aguak, initially planned to be converted for public school use, is set to become the new regional headquarters of ARMM's Bureau of Fire Protection but eventually became an infantry brigade of the Philippine Army.

Geography

Barangays
Shariff Aguak is politically subdivided into 13 barangays.

Bagong
Bialong
Kuloy
Labu-labu
Lapok (Lepok)
Malingao
Poblacion
Poblacion I
Poblacion II
Satan
Tapikan
Timbangan 
Tina

Climate

Demographics

Economy

Government

List of former chief executives
 Datu Akilan Ampatuan
 Datu Pinagayaw Ampatuan
 Datu Zainudin Ampatuan
 Datu Rustom Upam Ampatuan
 Datu Andal Salibo Ampatuan Sr.(1988–1998)
 Datu Zaldy Uy Ampatuan (2001–2005)
 Datu Anwar Uy Ampatuan (2005–2009)
 Datu Monir Ampatuan Asim Jr. (2009–2010)
 Bai Zahara Upam Ampatuan (2010–2015)
 Datu Marop Baganian Ampatuan (2015–2021)
 Akmad Ampatuan (2022–present)

See also
List of renamed cities and municipalities in the Philippines

References

External links
 Shariff Aguak Profile at the DTI Cities and Municipalities Competitive Index
MMA Act No. 45 : An Act changing the Name of the Municipality of Maganoy in the Province of Maguindanao into Municipality of Shariff Aguak
 [ Philippine Standard Geographic Code]
2000 Philippine Census Information
Local Governance Performance Management System

Municipalities of Maguindanao del Sur
Former provincial capitals of the Philippines
Establishments by Philippine executive order